The following is a list of people who have attended or taught at the University of North Texas.

Athletics
Stone Cold Steve Austin, wrestler
Bill Bishop, NFL defensive tackle
Bruce Chambers, former Texas Longhorns football assistant coach (1998–2014)
Patrick Cobbs, NFL running back
Lance Dunbar, NFL running back
Tony Elliott, NFL nose tackle
Toby Gowin, NFL punter
"Mean" Joe Greene, NFL Hall of Famer, NFL defensive tackle and assistant coach
Cedric Hardman, NFL football defensive end; 1970 first round draft pick, San Francisco 49ers
Abner Haynes, AFL and NFL running back
Jim Hess, former college coach and NFL scout
Don January, PGA Senior Tour golfer
Chris Jones (born 1993), basketball player for Maccabi Tel Aviv of the Israeli Basketball Premier League 
Carl "Spider" Lockhart, NFL defensive back
Billy Maxwell, PGA Senior Tour golfer
Tony Mitchell, NBA forward
Umar Muhammad, football player
Jamize Olawale, NFL fullback
Zach Orr, NFL linebacker
Carlos Ortiz, PGA Tour golfer
Willie Parker, NFL offensive lineman
Ray Renfro, NFL wide receiver
Hurles Scales, NFL defensive back
Kal Segrist, MLB second baseman and Texas Tech Red Raiders baseball head coach (1968–83)
Ron Shanklin, NFL receiver and All-Pro player
Charlie Shepard, all-star CFL running back
J.T. Smith, NFL wide receiver 
Dennis Swilley, NFL offensive lineman
Tra Telligman, UFC fighter
Harry Vines, wheelchair basketball pioneer
Brian Waters, NFL offensive lineman
Brad Kassell, NFL Defensive Player
Johnny Quinn, USA Olympic Bobsled

Arts and media
Lawrence B. Jones, journalist, news anchor, news reporter, investigative reporter, and Fox News media personality 
Theodore Albrecht, musicologist
Larry Austin, composer
Joe Don Baker, film actor, Charley Varrick, Walking Tall, Cape Fear, three James Bond films
Dave Barnett, sports announcer
William Basinski, musician
Bob Belden, jazz musician, Grammy Award-winning composer
Brian Biggs, children's book illustrator
Sally Blakemore, paper engineer and pop-up book creator
Joan Blondell, Oscar-nominated film and television actress, Desk Set, Nightmare Alley, The Cincinnati Kid, Grease
Craig Bohmler, composer
Zach Bolton, voice actor
Pat Boone, pop and gospel singer, actor and television personality
Billy Lee Brammer, novelist and journalist
Justin Briner, voice actor
Brave Combo, Grammy-winning polka rock band
Karen Mixon Cook, disc jockey
Eden Brent, blues pianist and vocalist
Rogers Cadenhead, author of computer books; Web publisher; member of RSS Advisory Board
Matt Chamberlain, session drummer
Thomas Haden Church, Oscar-nominated and Emmy-winning film and television actor, Sideways, Spider-Man 3, Broken Trail
Jeff Coffin, jazz saxophonist of Dave Matthews band and Béla Fleck and the Flecktones
Joseph Patrick Cranshaw, film actor, best known as "Blue" from movie Old School
Ivan Davis, classical concert pianist
Aaron Dismuke, voice actor
Miranda Dodson, Christian folk musician
Bob Dorough, bebop and jazz pianist/vocalist of  Schoolhouse Rock songs
George Dunham, radio talk-show host and former "voice of the Mean Green Radio Network"
Matthew Earnest, theatre director
Greg Edmonson, musician
Todd and Toby Pipes, one hit wonders from the 1990s (Deep Blue Something)
Rob Erdle, watercolorist, regents' professor
Charlie Fern, White House speechwriter, journalist
Kelli Finglass Director of the Dallas Cowboys Cheerleaders, television personality, television producer
Mark Followill, sports announcer
O'Neil Ford, architect whose works include San Antonio's Tower of the Americas
Steven Fromholz, singer-songwriter, 2007 Poet Laureate of Texas
Bobby Fuller, rock singer/guitarist best known for his band's cover of "I Fought the Law"
Phyllis George, Miss America 1971; First Lady of Kentucky, 1979–83; TV personality; broadcaster for The NFL Today
Jimmy Giuffre, jazz musician
James Hampton, actor and director
Gerald Harvey Jones, a.k.a. G. Harvey, (1933-2017), painter.
Kyle Hebert, voice actor
Don Henley, Grammy-winning singer-songwriter and drummer, solo and with The Eagles
Sara Hickman, folk singer/songwriter
Ray Wylie Hubbard, country music singer
Timothy Huskey, decorated soldier (Distinguished Flying Cross and Bronze Star) and author
Kyle Irion, blogger and fiction author
Elliott Johnson, artist and designer
Norah Jones, Grammy-winning pianist and singer-songwriter
Jeffrey L. Kimball, cinematographer of Top Gun
Scott Kurtz, creator of the webcomic PvP
Sue Ane Langdon, actress
Michael Lark, comic book artist
Lecrae, Christian hip-hop artist, actor, co-founder of Reach Records
T. Lewis, illustrator of the comic strip Over the Hedge
Tom "Bones" Malone, trombonist; played with Saturday Night Live and Late Show with David Letterman house bands, and The Blues Brothers
"Blue Lou" Marini, saxophonist; played with Saturday Night Live house band and The Blues Brothers
Jim Marrs, conspiracy theorist and author of Crossfire: the Plot that Killed Kennedy (the basis for the Oliver Stone film JFK)
Lyle Mays, composer and keyboardist with Pat Metheny Group
Dr. Phil McGraw, television personality and psychologist
Eli McDonald, artist
Larry McMurtry, novelist, essayist and screenwriter; won Pulitzer Prize for novel Lonesome Dove and  Academy Award for screenplay of Brokeback Mountain
Meat Loaf, rock singer and film actor
Bill Mercer, sports and professional wrestling announcer
Takesha Meshé Kizart, operatic soprano
Jim Metcalf, news reporter and Peabody Award recipient
R.K. Milholland, creator of webcomics Something Positive, New Gold Dreams and Midnight Macabre
Lawrence Montaigne, actor, writer, dancer, and stuntman
Latonia Moore, operatic soprano
Maren Morris, Grammy Award-winning singer-songwriter
Bill Moyers, journalist and commentator
Jack Nance, stage, TV and film actor, notable for his works with director David Lynch including Eraserhead, Twin Peaks
Trina Nishimura, voice actor
Warren Carl Norwood, author of science-fiction novels
Roy Orbison, rock singer-songwriter in Rock and Roll Hall of Fame
Brina Palencia, voice actor
Alan Palomo, frontman for Neon Indian
Jessie Pavelka, television star and model
Craig Pilo (born 1972), drummer
David Portillo, operatic tenor
Emily Pulley, operatic soprano who has performed in more than 150 operas
Patricia Racette, operatic soprano
Leila Rahimi, sports reporter and anchor
Anne Rice, author, Interview with the Vampire
Michelle Rojas, voice actor
Jim Rotondi,  jazz trumpeter, educator and conductor
Melissa Rycroft, dancer and television personality
Christopher Sabat, voice actor
Emilia Schatz, video game designer at Naughty Dog
Ann Sheridan, film actress, star of Dodge City, The Man Who Came to Dinner, Nora Prentiss
Clinton Howard Swindle, journalist and author
Alexis Tipton, voice actor
Darren Trumeter, member of The Whitest Kids U' Know comedy troupe
Paul Varghese, stand-up comedian, appeared on NBC's Last Comic Standing
Jennifer Vasquez, Big Brother season 6 contestant; actor
David Von Erich, deceased professional wrestler dubbed the "Yellow Rose of Texas," brother of Kevin Von Erich
Kevin Von Erich, professional wrestler dubbed "the Golden Warrior", brother of David Von Erich
Craig Way, sports announcer
Peter Weller, film actor and star of RoboCop
Noble Willingham, television and film actor, Walker, Texas Ranger, Good Morning, Vietnam, City Slickers
Kaela Sinclair, musician, keyboardist and vocalist for M83
Shara Worden, musician, performs under the name My Brightest Diamond
Xiaoze Xie, artist
Denny Thomas, emmy winning editor

Science and education
 W. J. Adkins, B.A. 1930 (1907-1965), founding president of Laredo Community College
 Elise F. Harmon, B.S. (1909-1985), physicist, chemist, and major contributor to the miniaturization of computers
 Anita Jose, Ph.D, business strategist, essayist, and professor at Hood College
 John E. King, PhD, president of the Kansas State Teachers College (now Emporia State University); president of the University of Wyoming, 1966-1967
Juan L. Maldonado (B.A. 1972, Master of Education 1975) has been the president of Laredo Community College since 2007.
 Gary S. Metcalf (1957), organizational theorist and management consultant
 Charles Mullins, cardiologist and former CEO, Parkland Hospital; administrator, University of Texas System
 Lorene Lane Rogers, Ph.D. (1914–2009), president of The University of Texas, first woman president of a major public university
 Nicola Scafetta, Ph.D, physicist

Government and public service 
Adel al-Jubeir, Saudi Minister of Foreign Affairs since 29 April 2015. He was the former ambassador to Washington, former adviser to the Royal Court of Saudi Arabia 
Dick Armey, former Majority Leader of the United States House of Representatives, Texas District 26, which includes UNT, former economics professor and department chair at UNT
Robert Lee Bobbitt, Speaker of the Texas House of Representatives (1927-1929); Attorney General of Texas (1929-1930); state court judge (1935-1937); chairman of the Texas Highway Department (1937-1943)
Michael C. Burgess, current U.S. representative for the 26th Texas district, which includes UNT
Konni Burton, Texas State Senator as of 2015
Jack Cox, Republican gubernatorial nominee in 1962; Houston oilfield equipment industrialist
Tony Goolsby (Class of 1961), member of the Texas House of Representatives from Dallas County from 1989 to 2009
Warren G. Harding, former Texas State Treasurer (1977-1983) and Dallas County Treasurer (1950-1977); former President of North Texas State University.
Jim Hightower, populist activist and former Texas Commissioner of Agriculture
Hannah Horick, Texas Young Democrats President, Ector County Democratic Party Chair, Odessa Under 40 Recipient 
Opal Lee, activist who championed Juneteenth becoming a U.S. Federal holiday 
Joseph L. Lengyel, General, U.S. Air Force; Chief, National Guard Bureau
Clint Lorance (born 1984), Army officer convicted of second-degree murder for battlefield deaths; pardoned
Diane Patrick (Class of 1969 and 1999, M.A. and Ph.D.), member of the Texas House of Representatives from Arlington; former faculty member in education
Ray Roberts, former Congressman from Denton; namesake of nearby Lake Ray Roberts
Gwyn Shea, former Texas secretary of state (2002-2003) and a member of the Texas House of Representatives (1983-1993) from Irving; UNT regent since 2007
Drew Springer, Jr., state representative from District 68 in North Texas and the eastern South Plains
Barbara Staff, co-chairman of the 1976 Texas Ronald Reagan presidential primary campaign

Pageantry 
R'Bonney Gabriel, first Asian-American Miss Texas USA, winner of Miss USA 2022

References

University of North Texas alumni